Nidularium is a genus in the plant family Bromeliaceae, subfamily Bromelioideae. Named to describe the nestling characteristic of the inflorescence (Lat. nidulus = little nest), all the species are endemic to Brazil. Commonly confused with Neoregelia which they resemble, this plant group was first described in 1854.

Species
 Nidularium albiflorum (L.B. Smith) Leme
 Nidularium altimontanum Leme
 Nidularium alvimii W. Weber
 Nidularium amazonicum (Baker) Linden & E. Morren ex Lindman
 Nidularium amorimii Leme
 Nidularium angustibracteatum Leme
 Nidularium angustifolium Ule
 Nidularium antoineanum Wawra
 Nidularium apiculatum L.B. Smith
 var. serrulatum L.B. Smith
 Nidularium atalaiaense E. Pereira & Leme
 Nidularium azureum (L.B. Smith) Leme
 Nidularium bicolor (E. Pereira) Leme
 Nidularium bocainense Leme
 Nidularium campo-alegrense Leme
 Nidularium campos-portoi (L.B. Smith) Wanderley & B.A. Moreira
 var. robustum (E. Pereira & I.A. Penna) Leme
 Nidularium cariacicaense (W. Weber) Leme
 Nidularium catarinense Leme
 Nidularium corallinum (Leme) Leme
 Nidularium espiritosantense Leme
 Nidularium ferdinando-coburgii Wawra
 Nidularium ferrugineum Leme
 Nidularium fradense Leme
 Nidularium fulgens Lemaire
 Nidularium innocentii Lemaire
 var. lineatum (Mez) L.B. Smith
 var. striatum (W. Bull) Wittmack
 Nidularium itatiaiae L.B. Smith
 Nidularium jonesianum Leme
 Nidularium kautskyanum Leme
 Nidularium krisgreeniae Leme
 Nidularium linehamii Leme
 Nidularium longiflorum Ule
 Nidularium mangaratibense Leme
 Nidularium marigoi Leme
 Nidularium meeanum Leme, Wanderley & Mollo
 Nidularium minutum Mez
 Nidularium organense Leme
 Nidularium picinguabense Leme
 Nidularium procerum Lindman
 Nidularium purpureum Beer
 Nidularium rosulatum Ule
 Nidularium rubens Mez
 Nidularium rutilans E. Morren
 Nidularium scheremetiewii Regel
 Nidularium serratum Leme
 Nidularium utriculosum Ule
 Nidularium viridipetalum Leme

Gallery

References

External links
FCBS Nidularium Photos
BSI Genera Gallery photos

 
Endemic flora of Brazil
Bromeliaceae genera